Frank Tinitelia is a New Zealand former professional rugby league footballer who represented New Zealand.

Playing career
A prop forward, Tinitelia played for the Otahuhu Leopards in the Auckland Rugby League competition.

He represented Auckland and in 1983 was called up to play for the New Zealand national rugby league team. He played in one test match against Papua New Guinea, becoming Kiwi number 577.

References

Living people
New Zealand rugby league players
New Zealand national rugby league team players
Auckland rugby league team players
Otahuhu Leopards players
Rugby league props
Year of birth missing (living people)